Sir John Henry Orr  (13 June 1918 – 26 September 1995) was a Scottish police officer and was the first Chief Constable of the Lothian and Borders Police. He was also a former Scotland international rugby union player.

Police career

Orr became a clerk with the then Edinburgh City Police.  After becoming a full police constable, he rose through the ranks and became Chief Constable of the former Lothians and Peebles Constabulary. Following a merger of three police forces on 16 May 1975, John Orr became the first Chief Constable of the newly created Lothian and Borders Police, serving in the post until 1983.

He was awarded an OBE in 1972, the Queen's Police Medal (QPM) in 1977, and was made a Knight Bachelor in the 1979 Birthday Honours.

Rugby Union career

Amateur career

Orr played for the Edinburgh City Police rugby team.

Provincial career

He played in the 1946 inter-city match for Edinburgh District.

International career

He played for Scotland twice in 1947.

Administrative career

He became the 89th President of the Scottish Rugby Union. He served the standard one year from 1975 to 1976.

References

1918 births
1995 deaths
Scottish police officers
Officers in Scottish police forces
British Chief Constables
People educated at George Heriot's School
Officers of the Order of the British Empire
Scottish recipients of the Queen's Police Medal
Knights Bachelor
Edinburgh District (rugby union) players
Presidents of the Scottish Rugby Union
Scottish rugby union players
Scotland international rugby union players
Rugby union players from Edinburgh
Rugby union flankers